Dimitrios Stamou (born 27 April 1991) is a Greek professional footballer who plays as a centre-back for Super League 2 club Ierapetra.

He started his career in Iraklis before moving to PAOK and Kerkyra. Stamou has been capped for Greece U21.

Club career

Iraklis
Stamou is a product of the youth academies of Iraklis and signed his first professional contract for the club in the summer of 2010. He debuted in the Superleague debut during a 0–0 home draw against Kerkyra. In the end, he managed to make 3 league appearances for the club.

PAOK
On 29 July 2011, Stamou signed a three-year contract with PAOK, after he was released from Iraklis. However, due to a series of injuries and subsequent operations, he failed to make his debut in the 2011–12 season. In January 2013 Stamou was loaned out to Kerkyra to get some playing time. He debuted for the club on 20 January 2013 in an away match against Skoda Xanthi. He totally appeared in 7 league matches for the club and in one cup match. Stamou returned to PAOK in the following summer. In July 2014 he was released by PAOK.

Return to Iraklis
On 29 July 2014 Stamou returned to Iraklis by signing a two-year contract.

Platanias
On 28 June 2017 Stamou signed a three-year contract with Platanias.

Third spell with iraklis
On 7 August 2018, he returned to Iraklis for the third time in his career.

International career
Stamou is a Greece national under-21 football team international. He was called by Greece under-21 manager Georgios Georgiadis for the first time in June 2011 to appear in two friendly matches against Bulgaria under-21 and Poland under-21. He made his debut in an official UEFA under-21 match during a 2011 UEFA European Under-21 Football Championship qualification match against Belarus.

Playing style
Stamou is 1.83 meters tall and is equally adept at playing as either a defensive midfielder or a centre back.

References

External links

1991 births
Living people
Greek footballers
Greece under-21 international footballers
Iraklis Thessaloniki F.C. players
PAOK FC players
A.O. Kerkyra players
Platanias F.C. players
Veria NFC players
Olympiacos Volos F.C. players
Super League Greece players
Super League Greece 2 players
Association football defenders
Footballers from Thessaloniki